The Kuwait Amateur Radio Society (KARS) (in Arabic, الجمعية الكويتية لهواة اللاسلكي) is a national non-profit organization for amateur radio enthusiasts in Kuwait.  The organization uses KARS as its official international abbreviation, based on the English translation of the organization's name.  KARS operates a QSL bureau for those members who regularly communicate with amateur radio operators in other countries, and offers radio equipment to its members for their use.  KARS represents the interests of Kuwaiti amateur radio operators and shortwave listeners before Kuwaiti and international telecommunications regulatory authorities.  KARS is the national member society representing Kuwait in the International Amateur Radio Union.
Board members:Hamad Alnusif, 9K2HN ( Chairman ),   Eng. Faisal Alajmi, 9K2RR ( Vice Chairman ),   Waleed Abul, 9K2OK ( General Secretary ),   Basel Albaker, 9K2RX ( Treasurer ),   Ahmad Ali, 9K2QA ( member ),   Nawaf Almuharib, 9K2NM ( member ),   Ali Mubarak, 9K2SS ( member )

See also 
Amateur Radio Association of Bahrain
Emirates Amateur Radio Society
Qatar Amateur Radio Society

References 

Kuwait
Communications and media organizations based in Kuwait
1979 establishments in Kuwait
Organizations established in 1979
Radio in Kuwait
Organizations based in Kuwait City